B. africanus may refer to:

 Bubo africanus, the Spotted Eagle-owl, a medium-sized species of owl species
 Buphagus africanus, the Yellow-billed Oxpecker, a passerine bird species

See also
 Africanus (disambiguation)